Trauma soundtrack albums are a series of television soundtrack albums for the Canadian television drama series Trauma, released in the 2010s.

The series has aired five seasons to date. For each season, a single pop singer from Quebec has recorded all music for the entire season, generally consisting of cover versions of famous pop and rock songs; fourth season performer Martha Wainwright, however, included three French language rerecordings of her own songs.

Music was recorded by Ariane Moffatt in the first and second seasons, Pascale Picard Band in the third, Martha Wainwright in the fourth and Cœur de pirate in the fifth season.

Seasons 1 and 2
Trauma: Chansons de la Série Télé, recorded by Ariane Moffatt, was released as an album in December 2010. It comprised songs recorded for both of the first two seasons.

Season 3
Trauma: Chansons de la Série Télé, Saison #3, recorded by Pascale Picard Band, was released as an album in 2012.

Season 4
Trauma: Chansons de la Série Télé, Saison #4, recorded by Martha Wainwright, was released as an album on February 26, 2013.

Season 5
Trauma: Chansons de la Série Télé, Saison #5, recorded by Cœur de pirate, was released as an album on January 14, 2014.

References

2010 soundtrack albums
2012 soundtrack albums
2013 soundtrack albums
2014 soundtrack albums
Cœur de pirate albums
Martha Wainwright albums
Television soundtracks